This is a list of captains regent (Capitani Reggenti) of San Marino from 1701 to 1900.

{| class="wikitable"
|- 
! Year
! Semester
! Captain Regent
! Captain Regent
|-
| 1701 || April || Alfonso Tosini || Francesco Moracci
|-
| 1701 || October   || Giuliano Belluzzi || Lorenzo Giangi
|-
| 1702 || April || Giuseppe Loli || Melchiorre Martelli
|-
| 1702 || October   || Giovanni Antonio Belluzzi || Gaspare Calbini
|-
| 1703 || April || Bernardino Leonardelli || Giovanni Antonio Fattori
|-
| 1703 || October   || Onofrio Onofri || Baldassarre Tini
|-
| 1704 || April || Ottavio Leonardelli || Pietro Francini
|-
| 1704 || October   || Giambattista Tosini || Tommaso Ceccoli
|-
| 1705 || April || Gian Giacomo Angeli || Lorenzo Giangi
|-
| 1705 || October   || Giuseppe Loli || Melchiorre Martelli
|-
| 1706 || April || Giovanni Cionini || Gaspare Calbini
|-
| 1706 || October   || Francesco Maccioni || Giambattista Ceccoli
|-
| 1707 || April || Onofrio Onofri || Giuseppe Zampini
|-
| 1707 || October   || Federico Gozi || Francesco Moracci
|-
| 1708 || April || Giuliano Belluzzi || Tommaso Ceccoli
|-
| 1708 || October   || Marino Enea Bonelli || Baldassarre Tini
|-
| 1709 || April || Gian Giacomo Angeli || Francesco Giangi
|-
| 1709 || October   || Giovanni Antonio Belluzzi || Giovanni Antonio Fattori
|-
| 1710 || April || Giovanni Cionini || Melchiorre Martelli
|-
| 1710 || October   || Francesco Maccioni || Pietro Francini
|-
| 1711 || April || Giuseppe Loli || Girolamo Martelli
|-
| 1711 || October   || Federico Gozi || Giuseppe Zampini
|-
| 1712 || April || Onofrio Onofri || Giovanni Martelli
|-
| 1712 || October   || Gian Giacomo Angeli || Bartolomeo Bedetti
|-
| 1713 || April || Giovanni Antonio Belluzzi || Giovanni Antonio Fattori
|-
| 1713 || October   || Giuliano Belluzzi || Tommaso Ceccoli
|-
| 1714 || April || Giuseppe Onofri || Lorenzo Giangi
|-
| 1714 || October   || Giuseppe Loli || Pietro Francini
|-
| 1715 || April || Giovanni Paolo Valloni || Giuseppe Zampini
|-
| 1715 || October   || Bernardino Leonardelli || Marino Enea Bonelli
|-
| 1716 || April || Gian Giacomo Angeli || Giovanni Martelli
|-
| 1716 || October   || Francesco Maria Belluzzi || Bartolomeo Bedetti
|-
| 1717 || April || Federico Gozi || Girolamo Martelli
|-
| 1717 || October   || Ottavio Leonardelli || Francesco Giangi
|-
| 1718 || April || Giuliano Belluzzi || Marino Beni
|-
| 1718 || October   || Tranquillo Manenti Belluzzi || Tommaso Ceccoli
|-
| 1719 || April || Giovanni Paolo Valloni || Baldassarre Tini (died in office)Francesco Moracci (replacement)
|-
| 1719 || October   || Gian Giacomo Angeli || Lorenzo Giangi
|-
| 1720 || April || Benedetto Belluzzi || Giovanni Martelli
|-
| 1720 || October   || Marino Enea Bonelli || Bartolomeo Bedetti
|-
| 1721 || April || Federico Gozi || Girolamo Martelli
|-
| 1721 || October   || Bernardino Leonardelli || Francesco Giangi
|-
| 1722 || April || Francesco Maria Belluzzi || Marino Beni
|-
| 1722 || October   || Valerio Maccioni || Pier Antonio Ugolini
|-
| 1723 || April || Giuseppe Onofri || Tommaso Ceccoli
|-
| 1723 || October   || Pietro Loli || Giovanni Martelli
|-
| 1724 || April || Giovanni Paolo Valloni || Biagio Antonio Martelli
|-
| 1724 || October   || Marino Enea Bonelli || Bartolomeo Bedetti
|-
| 1725 || April || Gian Giacomo Angeli || Lorenzo Giangi
|-
| 1725 || October   || Federico Gozi || Marino Beni
|-
| 1726 || April || Tranquillo Manenti Belluzzi || Girolamo Martelli
|-
| 1726 || October   || Valerio Maccioni || Pier Antonio Ugolini
|-
| 1727 || April || Giuseppe Onofri || Tommaso Ceccoli
|-
| 1727 || October   || Gentile Maria Maggio || Giovanni Martelli
|-
| 1728 || April || Francesco Maria Belluzzi || Biagio Antonio Martelli
|-
| 1728 || October   || Marino Enea Bonelli || Bernardino Capicchioni
|-
| 1729 || April || Giovanni Paolo Valloni || Francesco Giangi
|-
| 1729 || October   || Gian Giacomo Angeli || Giovanni Andrea Beni
|-
| 1730 || April || Valerio Maccioni || Pier Antonio Ugolini
|-
| 1730 || October   || Tranquillo Manenti Belluzzi || Girolamo Martelli
|-
| 1731 || April || Giuseppe Onofri || Lodovico Anatucci
|-
| 1731 || October   || Giovanni Antonio Leonardelli || Bartolomeo Bedetti
|-
| 1732 || April || Giovanni Benedetto Belluzzi || Giovanni Martelli
|-
| 1732 || October   || Valerio Maccioni || Vincenzo Moracci
|-
| 1733 || April || Francesco Maria Belluzzi || Giovanni Maria Giangi
|-
| 1733 || October   || Giovanni Paolo Valloni || Giovanni Maria Beni
|-
| 1734 || April || Marino Enea Bonelli || Tommaso Capicchioni
|-
| 1734 || October   || Giuseppe Onofri || Lodovico Anatucci
|-
| 1735 || April || Tranquillo Manenti Belluzzi || Biagio Antonio Martelli
|-
| 1735 || October   || Federico Tosini || Pier Antonio Ugolini
|-
| 1736 || April || Gian Giacomo Angeli || Girolamo Martelli
|-
| 1736 || October   || Francesco Maria Belluzzi || Giovanni Maria Giangi
|-
| 1737 || April || Valerio Maccioni || Vincenzo Moracci
|-
| 1737 || October   || Filippo Manenti Belluzzi || Giuliano Malpeli
|-
| 1738 || April || Giuseppe Onofri || Giovanni Maria Beni
|-
| 1738 || October   || Giovanni Antonio Leonardelli || Giovanni Martelli
|-
| 1739 || April || Giovanni Benedetto Belluzzi || Biagio Antonio Martelli
|-
| 1739 || October   || Gian Giacomo Angeli || Alfonso Giangi
|-
| 1739 || end Oct. Gaspare Fogli, gonfalonier (during Cardinal Giulio Alberoni's invasion)
|-
| 1740 || 5 February || Marino Enea Bonelli || Alfonso Giangi
|-
| 1740 || October   || Giuseppe Onofri || Vincenzo Moracci
|-
| 1741 || April || Giovanni Maria Giangi || Marino Tini
|-
| 1741 || October   || Lodovico Belluzzi || Pier Antonio Ugolini
|-
| 1742 || April || Girolamo Gozi || Giovanni Martelli
|-
| 1742 || October   || Biagio Antonio Martelli || Domenico Bertoni
|-
| 1743 || April || Filippo Manenti Belluzzi || Filippo Fabbrini
|-
| 1743 || October   || Giacomo Begni || Francesco Antonio Righi
|-
| 1744 || April || Giuseppe Onofri || Alfonso Giangi
|-
| 1744 || October   || Giovanni Maria Giangi || Vincenzo Moracci
|-
| 1745 || April || Giambattista Zampini || Pompeo Zoli
|-
| 1745 || October   || Girolamo Gozi || Tommaso Capicchioni
|-
| 1746 || April || Lodovico Belluzzi || Marc' Antonio Tassini
|-
| 1746 || October   || Filippo Manenti Belluzzi || Domenico Bertoni
|-
| 1747 || April || Giacomo Begni || Ottavio Fazzini
|-
| 1747 || October   || Biagio Antonio Martelli || Giovanni Martelli
|-
| 1748 || April || Giovanni Marino Giangi || Francesco Antonio Righi
|-
| 1748 || October   || Costantino Bonelli || Pompeo Zoli
|-
| 1749 || April || Giuseppe Onofri || Vincenzo Moracci
|-
| 1749 || October   || Lodovico Belluzzi || Marc' Antonio Tassini
|-
| 1750 || April || Filippo Manenti Belluzzi || Pier Antonio Ugolini
|-
| 1750 || October   || Giovanni Antonio Leonardelli || Alfonso Giangi
|-
| 1751 || April || Aurelio Valloni || Filippo Fabbrini
|-
| 1751 || October   || Giovanni Maria Giangi || Marino Tini
|-
| 1752 || April || Giacomo Begni || Pompeo Zoli
|-
| 1752 || October   || Costantino Bonelli || Giovanni Martelli
|-
| 1753 || April || Giuseppe Onofri || Giuseppe Franzoni
|-
| 1753 || October   || Filippo Manenti Belluzzi || Marc' Antonio Tassini
|-
| 1754 || April || Girolamo Gozi || Vincenzo Moracci
|-
| 1754 || October   || Francesco Maccioni || Ottavio Fazzini
|-
| 1755 || April || Biagio Antonio Martelli || Giuseppe Bertoni
|-
| 1755 || October   || Giacomo Begni || Paolo Tini
|-
| 1756 || April || Marino Belluzzi || Francesco Casali
|-
| 1756 || October   || Giovanni Beni || Francesco Antonio Righi
|-
| 1757 || April || Giambattista Angeli || Marc' Antonio Tassini
|-
| 1757 || October   || Filippo Manenti Belluzzi || Antonio Capicchioni
|-
| 1758 || April || Lodovico Belluzzi || Marino Tini
|-
| 1758 || October   || Giovanni Maria Giangi || Giuseppe Franzoni
|-
| 1759 || April || Giacomo Begni || Pompeo Zoli
|-
| 1759 || October   || Giovanni Antonio Leonardelli || Filippo Fazzini
|-
| 1760 || April || Aurelio Valloni || Francesco Antonio Righi
|-
| 1760 || October   || Giambattista Angeli || Giovanni Pietro Martelli
|-
| 1761 || April || Francesco Maccioni || Marino Martelli
|-
| 1761 || October   || Filippo Manenti || Marc' Antonio Tassini
|-
| 1762 || April || Giovanni Maria Giangi || Giuseppe Bertoni
|-
| 1762 || October   || Giambattista Zampini || Pompeo Zoli
|-
| 1763 || April || Giambattista Bonelli || Filippo Fazzini
|-
| 1763 || October   || Girolamo Gozi || Paolo Tini
|-
| 1764 || April || Giambattista Angeli || Antonio Capicchioni
|-
| 1764 || October   || Giovanni Antonio Leonardelli || Marino Martelli
|-
| 1765 || April || Filippo Manenti || Marc' Antonio Tassini
|-
| 1765 || October   || Francesco Begni || Francesco Benedetti
|-
| 1766 || April || Filippo Belluzzi || Pompeo Zoli
|-
| 1766 || October   || Giuseppe Giannini || Giuseppe Franzoni
|-
| 1767 || April || Francesco Maccioni || Filippo Fazzini
|-
| 1767 || October   || Giambattista Angeli || Giuseppe Bertoni
|-
| 1768 || April || Giuliano Gozi || Francesco Casali
|-
| 1768 || October   || Costantino Bonelli || Giovanni Antonio Malpeli
|-
| 1769 || April || Baldassarre Giangi || Marc' Antonio Tassini
|-
| 1769 || October   || Filippo Manenti || Francesco Antonio Casali
|-
| 1770 || April || Gaetano Belluzzi || Pompeo Zoli
|-
| 1770 || October   || Giuseppe Giannini || Antonio Capicchioni
|-
| 1771 || April || Giambattista Angeli || Filippo Fazzini
|-
| 1771 || October   || Giuliano Gozi || Angelo Ortolani
|-
| 1772 || April || Sebastiano Onofri || Giuseppe Bertoni
|-
| 1772 || October   || Baldassarre Giangi || Francesco di Livio Casali
|-
| 1773 || April || Costantino Bonelli || Giovanni Antonio Malpeli
|-
| 1773 || October   || Francesco Manenti || Pompeo Zoli
|-
| 1774 || April || Gaetano Belluzzi || Antonio Capicchioni
|-
| 1774 || October   || Giuliano Belluzzi || Francesco Antonio Casali
|-
| 1775 || April || Giuliano Gozi || Angelo Ortolani
|-
| 1775 || October   || Giambattista Angeli || Girolamo Paoloni
|-
| 1776 || April || Giuseppe Giannini || Antimo Meloni
|-
| 1776 || October   || Francesco Onofri || Francesco di Livio Casali
|-
| 1777 || April || Costantino Bonelli || Francesco Moracci
|-
| 1777 || October   || Pier Antonio Leonardelli || Giovanni Antonio Malpeli
|-
| 1778 || April || Baldassarre Giangi || Francesco Antonio Casali (died in office)Alessandro Martelli (replacement)
|-
| 1778 || October   || Giambattista Bonelli || Pier Francesco Meloni
|-
| 1779 || April || Giuliano Gozi || Angelo Ortolani
|-
| 1779 || October   || Filippo Belluzzi || Pompeo Zoli
|-
| 1780 || April || Francesco Manenti || Antonio Capicchioni
|-
| 1780 || October   || Costantino Bonelli || Francesco di Livio Casali
|-
| 1781 || April || Pier Antonio Leonardelli || Girolamo Paoloni
|-
| 1781 || October   || Baldassarre Giangi || Giovanni Antonio Malpeli
|-
| 1782 || April || Giambattista Bonelli || Antimo Meloni
|-
| 1782 || October   || Giuseppe Giannini || Francesco Malpeli
|-
| 1783 || April || Francesco Begni || Pompeo Zoli
|-
| 1783 || October   || Giuliano Gozi || Pier Francesco Vita
|-
| 1784 || April || Giambattista Zampini || Angelo Ortolani
|-
| 1784 || October   || Francesco Manenti || Marino Francesconi
|-
| 1785 || April || Marino Giangi || Giovanni Antonio Malpeli
|-
| 1785 || October   || Pier Antonio Leonardelli || Girolamo Paoloni
|-
| 1786 || April || Giambattista Bonelli || Matteo Martelli
|-
| 1786 || October   || Giuliano Gozi || Francesco Faetani
|-
| 1787 || April || Giuliano Gozi || Francesco Faetani
|-
| 1787 || October   || Francesco Onofri || Francesco Tini
|-
| 1788 || April || Giambattista Bonelli || Giovanni Filippi
|-
| 1788 || October   || Francesco Begni || Filippo Fazzini
|-
| 1789 || April || Giuliano Belluzzi || Silvestro Masi
|-
| 1789 || October   || Marino Giangi || Francesco Belzoppi
|-
| 1790 || April || Mariano Begni || Matteo Martelli
|-
| 1790 || October   || Filippo Belluzzi || Antonio Capicchioni
|-
| 1791 || April || Francesco Giannini || Antimo Meloni
|-
| 1791 || October   || Antonio Onofri || Girolamo Paoloni
|-
| 1792 || April || Giuliano Gozi || Giovanni Filippi
|-
| 1792 || October   || Giambattista Bonelli || Marino Francesconi
|-
| 1793 || April || Giuliano Belluzzi || Marino Tassini
|-
| 1793 || October   || Marino Giangi || Felice Caroti
|-
| 1794 || April || Marino Begni || Antonio Capicchioni
|-
| 1794 || October   || Filippo Belluzzi || Pier Vincenzo Giannini
|-
| 1795 || April || Giuseppe Mercuri || Angelo Ortolani
|-
| 1795 || October   || Francesco Giannini || Livio Casali
|-
| 1796 || April || Giuliano Gozi || Matteo Martelli
|-
| 1796 || October   || Antonio Onofri || Marino Francesconi
|-
| 1797 || April || Giuliano Belluzzi || Girolamo Paoloni
|-
| 1797 || October   || Annibale Gozi || Antonio Capicchioni
|-
| 1798 || April || Marino Begni || Alessandro Righi
|-
| 1798 || October   || Marino Giangi || Vincenzo Belzoppi
|-
| 1799 || April || Francesco Giannini || Pietro Zoli
|-
| 1799 || October   || Camillo Bonelli || Livio Casali
|-
| 1800 || April || Francesco Faetani || Matteo Martelli
|-
| 1800 || October   || Giuseppe Mercuri || Pier Vincenzo Giannini
|-
| 1801 || April || Giuliano Belluzzi || Marino Bertoni
|-
| 1801 || October   || Mariano Begni || Antonio Capicchioni
|-
| 1802 || April || Filippo Belluzzi || Marino Tassini
|-
| 1802 || October   || Annibale Gozi || Giovanni Filippi
|-
| 1803 || April || Camillo Bonelli || Livio Casali
|-
| 1803 || October   || Antonio Onofri || Marino Francesconi
|-
| 1804 || April || Marino Belluzzi || Matteo Martelli
|-
| 1804 || October   || Francesco Giannini || Giuseppe Righi
|-
| 1805 || April || Francesco Maria Belluzzi || Antonio Capicchioni
|-
| 1805 || October   || Mariano Begni || Giovanni Malpeli
|-
| 1806 || April || Giuseppe Mercuri || Marino Tassini
|-
| 1806 || October   || Alessandro Righi || Pietro Berti
|-
| 1807 || April || Antonio Onofri || Marino Francesconi
|-
| 1807 || October   || Camillo Bonelli || Livio Casali
|-
| 1808 || April || Marino Giangi || Matteo Martelli
|-
| 1808 || October   || Federico Gozi || Pier Antonio Damiani
|-
| 1809 || April || Francesco Giannini || Vincenzo Belzoppi
|-
| 1809 || October   || Mariano Begni || Giovanni Malpeli
|-
| 1810 || April || Lodovico Belluzzi || Maria Giuseppe Malpeli
|-
| 1810 || October   || Antonio Onofri || Marino Francesconi
|-
| 1811 || April || Francesco Maria Belluzzi || Marino Bertoni
|-
| 1811 || October   || Giuseppe Mercuri || Pier Vincenzo Giannini
|-
| 1812 || April || Camillo Bonelli || Livio Casali
|-
| 1812 || October   || Francesco Giannini || Pietro Zoli
|-
| 1813 || April || Marino Belluzzi || Pier Antonio Damiani
|-
| 1813 || October   || Mariano Begni || Giovanni Malpeli
|-
| 1814 || April || Federico Gozi || Andrea Albertini
|-
| 1814 || October   || Lodovico Belluzzi || Maria Giuseppe Malpeli
|-
| 1815 || April || Giuseppe Mercuri || Pier Vincenzo Giannini
|-
| 1815 || October   || Francesco Maria Belluzzi || Filippo Filippi
|-
| 1816 || April || Camillo Bonelli || Pietro Berti
|-
| 1816 || October   || Luigi Giannini || Matteo Martelli
|-
| 1817 || April || Antonio Onofri || Pietro Zoli
|-
| 1817 || October   || Federico Gozi || Vincenzo Belzoppi
|-
| 1818 || April || Giuliano Malpeli || Livio Casali
|-
| 1818 || October   || Mariano Begni || Giovanni Malpeli
|-
| 1819 || April || Giuseppe Mercuri || Andrea Albertini
|-
| 1819 || October   || Francesco Maria Belluzzi || Filippo Filippi
|-
| 1820 || April || Luigi Giannini || Matteo Martelli
|-
| 1820 || October   || Camillo Bonelli || Marino Berti
|-
| 1821 || April || Antonio Onofri || Pier Vincenzo Giannini
|-
| 1821 || October   || Giuliano Malpeli || Pietro Berti
|-
| 1822 || April || Federico Gozi || Francesco Guidi Giangi
|-
| 1822 || October   || Mariano Begni || Giovanni Malpeli
|-
| 1823 || April || Giuseppe Mercuri || Marino Lonfernini
|-
| 1823 || October   || Francesco Maria Belluzzi || Filippo Filippi
|-
| 1824 || April || Lodovico Belluzzi || Vincenzo Braschi
|-
| 1824 || October   || Luigi Giannini || Bartolomeo Bartolotti
|-
| 1825 || April || Raffaele Gozi || Pietro Berti
|-
| 1825 || October   || Camillo Bonelli || Pier Antonio Damiani
|-
| 1826 || April || Giambattista Onofri || Marino Berti
|-
| 1826 || October   || Giuliano Malpeli || Marino Lonfernini
|-
| 1827 || April || Mariano Begni || Giovanni Malpeli
|-
| 1827 || October   || Lodovico Belluzzi || Vincenzo Braschi
|-
| 1828 || April || Francesco Maria Belluzzi || Francesco Guidi Giangi
|-
| 1828 || October   || Luigi Giannini || Giacomo Antonio Tini
|-
| 1829 || April || Camillo Bonelli || Pietro Zoli
|-
| 1829 || October   || Giuseppe Mercuri || Filippo Filippi
|-
| 1830 || April || Giuliano Malpeli || Marino Lonfernini
|-
| 1830 || October   || Giambattista Onofri || Pier Antonio Damiani
|-
| 1831 || April || Lodovico Belluzzi || Biagio Martelli
|-
| 1831 || October   || Francesco Maria Belluzzi || Pier Matteo Berti
|-
| 1832 || April || Giovanni Benedetto Belluzzi || Bartolomeo Bartolotti
|-
| 1832 || October   || Mariano Begni || Giovanni Malpeli
|-
| 1833 || April || Giuseppe Mercuri || Filippo Filippi
|-
| 1833 || October   || Luigi Giannini || Vincenzo Braschi
|-
| 1834 || April || Lodovico Belluzzi || Francesco Guidi Giangi
|-
| 1834 || October   || Giuliano Malpeli || Pietro Tassini
|-
| 1835 || April || Francesco Maria Belluzzi (died in office)Raffaele Gozi (replacement) || Pietro Zoli
|-
| 1835 || October   || Giambattista Bonelli || Bartolomeo Bartolotti
|-
| 1836 || April || Giovanni Benedetto Belluzzi || Pier Antonio Damiani
|-
| 1836 || October   || Giuseppe Gozi || Pier Matteo Berti
|-
| 1837 || April || Filippo Belluzzi || Filippo Filippi
|-
| 1837 || October   || Giuseppe Mercuri || Marc' Antonio Tassini
|-
| 1838 || April || Girolamo Gozi || Francesco Guidi Giangi
|-
| 1838 || October   || Mariano Begni || Domenico Maria Belzoppi
|-
| 1839 || April || Giambattista Bonelli || Bartolomeo Bartolotti
|-
| 1839 || October   || Giuliano Malpeli || Biagio Martelli
|-
| 1840 || April || Giovanni Benedetto Belluzzi || Pietro Righi
|-
| 1840 || October   || Raffaele Gozi || Pietro Zoli
|-
| 1841 || April || Filippo Belluzzi || Filippo Filippi
|-
| 1841 || October   || Girolamo Gozi || Francesco Guidi Giangi
|-
| 1842 || April || Domenico Maria Belzoppi || Pier Matteo Berti
|-
| 1842 || October   || Giuseppe Gozi || Domenic' Antonio Bartolotti
|-
| 1843 || April || Giuliano Malpeli || Marino Malpeli
|-
| 1843 || October   || Lodovico Belluzzi || Biagio Martelli
|-
| 1844 || April || Giovanni Benedetto Belluzzi || Pietro Righi
|-
| 1844 || October   || Pietro Zoli || Marino Berti
|-
| 1845 || April || Giambattista Bonelli || Francesco Valli
|-
| 1845 || October   || Domenico Maria Belzoppi || Pier Matteo Berti
|-
| 1846 || April || Filippo Belluzzi || Filippo Filippi
|-
| 1846 || October   || Francesco Guidi Giangi || Costanzo Damiani
|-
| 1847 || April || Girolamo Gozi || Domenic' Antonio Bartolotti
|-
| 1847 || October   || Giuliano Malpeli || Biagio Martelli
|-
| 1848 || April || Giuseppe Gozi || Marino Malpeli
|-
| 1848 || October   || Giovanni Benedetto Belluzzi || Pietro Righi
|-
| 1849 || April || Domenico Maria Belzoppi || Pier Matteo Berti
|-
| 1849 || October   || Giambattista Braschi || Marino Lonfernini
|-
| 1850 || April || Vincenzo Angeli || Costanzo Damiani
|-
| 1850 || October   || Giambattista Bonelli || Marino Berti
|-
| 1851 || April || Francesco Guidi Giangi || Marco Suzzi Valli
|-
| 1851 || October   || Domenic' Antonio Bartolotti || Antonio Para
|-
| 1852 || April || Melchiorre Filippi || Pietro Righi
|-
| 1852 || October   || Filippo Belluzzi || Gaetano Simoncini
|-
| 1853 || April || Domenico Maria Belzoppi || Pier Matteo Berti
|-
| 1853 || October   || Giambattista Braschi || Francesco Valli
|-
| 1854 || April || Girolamo Gozi || Pietro Ugolini
|-
| 1854 || October   || Francesco Guidi Giangi || Pietro Barbieri
|-
| 1855 || April || Gaetano Belluzzi (represented for most of his term by Filippo Belluzzi) || Francesco Rossini
|-
| 1855 || October   || Giovanni Benedetto Belluzzi || Marino Masi
|-
| 1856 || April || Giuseppe Filippi || Pietro Righi
|-
| 1856 || October   || Melchiorre Filippi || Gaetano Simoncini
|-
| 1857 || April || Innocenzo Bonelli || Domenico Fattori
|-
| 1857 || October   || Settimio Belluzzi || Giacomo Berti
|-
| 1858 || April || Francesco Guidi Giangi || Marino Malpeli
|-
| 1858 || October   || Filippo Belluzzi || Pasquale Marcucci
|-
| 1859 || April || Giuliano Belluzzi || Michele Ceccoli
|-
| 1859 || October   || Palamede Malpeli || Pier Matteo Berti
|-
| 1860 || April || Giuseppe Filippi || Pietro Righi
|-
| 1860 || October   || Gaetano Belluzzi || Costanzo Damiani
|-
| 1861 || April || Settimio Belluzzi || Giacomo Berti
|-
| 1861 || October   || Melchiorre Filippi || Domenico Fattori
|-
| 1862 || April || Innocenzo Bonelli || Gaetano Simoncini
|-
| 1862 || October   || Francesco Guidi Giangi || Pietro Tonnini
|-
| 1863 || April || Giuliano Belluzzi || Michele Ceccoli
|-
| 1863 || October   || Giuseppe Filippi || Francesco Casali
|-
| 1864 || April || Gaetano Belluzzi || Pietro Righi
|-
| 1864 || October   || Palamede Malpeli || Pasquale Marcucci
|-
| 1865 || April || Settimio Belluzzi || Giacomo Berti
|-
| 1865 || October   || Filippo Belluzzi || Silvestro Masi
|-
| 1866 || April || Innocenzo Bonelli || Michele Vita
|-
| 1866 || October   || Melchiorre Filippi || Domenico Fattori
|-
| 1867 || April || Giuliano Belluzzi || Michele Ceccoli
|-
| 1867 || October   || Gaetano Simoncini || Pietro Righi
|-
| 1868 || April || Palamede Malpeli || Giuseppe Vagnini
|-
| 1868 || October   || Pietro Tonnini || Sante Lonfernini
|-
| 1869 || April || Filippo Belluzzi || Francesco Malpeli
|-
| 1869 || October   || Settimio Belluzzi || Giacomo Berti
|-
| 1870 || April || Innocenzo Bonelli || Ortollero Grazia
|-
| 1870 || October   || Melchiorre Filippi || Domenico Fattori
|-
| 1871 || April || Gaetano Simoncini || Pietro Ugolini
|-
| 1871 || October   || Palamede Malpeli || Luigi Pasquali
|-
| 1872 || April || Giuliano Belluzzi || Pietro Berti
|-
| 1872 || October   || Federico Gozi || Francesco Malpeli
|-
| 1873 || April || Settimio Belluzzi || Francesco Marcucci
|-
| 1873 || October   || Giuseppe Filippi || Marino Fattori
|-
| 1874 || April || Filippo Belluzzi || Marino Babboni
|-
| 1874 || October   || Gaetano Simoncini || Domenico Fattori
|-
| 1875 || April || Palamede Malpeli || Luigi Pasquali
|-
| 1875 || October   || Pietro Tonnini || Giuseppe Giacomini
|-
| 1876 || April || Gaetano Belluzzi || Sante Lonfernini
|-
| 1876 || October   || Settimio Belluzzi || Michele Ceccoli
|-
| 1877 || April || Innocenzo Bonelli || Andrea Barbieri
|-
| 1877 || October   || Giuliano Belluzzi || Pietro Ugolini
|-
| 1878 || April || Domenico Fattori || Marino Babboni
|-
| 1878 || October   || Camillo Bonelli || Pietro Berti
|-
| 1879 || April || Gaetano Simoncini || Marino Nicolini
|-
| 1879 || October   || Federico Gozi || Francesco Malpeli
|-
| 1880 || April || Luigi Pasquali || Giuseppe Giacomini
|-
| 1880 || October   || Settimio Belluzzi || Pasquale Busignani
|-
| 1881 || April || Antonio Belluzzi || Marino Martelli
|-
| 1881 || October   || Domenico Fattori || Teodoro Ceccoli
|-
| 1882 || April || Marino Fattori || Francesco Marcucci
|-
| 1882 || October   || Giuliano Belluzzi || Michele Ceccoli
|-
| 1883 || April || Pietro Tonnini || Sante Lonfernini
|-
| 1883 || October   || Pietro Filippi || Pietro Berti
|-
| 1884 || April || Settimio Belluzzi || Francesco Malpeli
|-
| 1884 || October   || Federico Gozi || Antonio Righi
|-
| 1885 || April || Luigi Pasquali || Pasquale Busignani
|-
| 1885 || October   || Antonio Michetti || Marino Nicolini
|-
| 1886 || April || Domenico Fattori || Teodoro Ceccoli
|-
| 1886 || October   || Gaetano Simoncini || Pietro Ugolini
|-
| 1887 || April || Marino Fattori || Settimio Lonfernini
|-
| 1887 || October   || Pietro Filippi || Federico Martelli
|-
| 1888 || April || Settimio Belluzzi || Marino Marcucci
|-
| 1888 || October   || Federico Gozi || Antonio Righi
|-
| 1889 || April || Menetto Bonelli || Marino Babboni
|-
| 1889 || October   || Domenico Fattori || Marino Nicolini
|-
| 1890 || April || Pietro Tonnini || Francesco Marcucci
|-
| 1890 || October   || Giuliano Belluzzi || Pietro Ugolini
|-
| 1891 || April || Pietro Filippi || Federico Martelli
|-
| 1891 || October   || Antonio Michetti || Pasquale Busignani
|-
| 1892 || April || Federico Gozi || Silvestro Vita
|-
| 1892 || October   || Gemino Gozi || Giacomo Marcucci
|-
| 1893 || April || Menetto Bonelli || Marino Babboni
|-
| 1893 || October   || Marino Fattori || Pietro Francini
|-
| 1894 || April || Pietro Tonnini (died 22 August)Giuliano Belluzzi (replacement) || Francesco Marcucci
|-
| 1894 || October   || Settimio Belluzzi || Marino Borbiconi
|-
| 1895 || April || Domenico Fattori || Antonio Righi
|-
| 1895 || October   || Federico Gozi || Vincenzo Mularoni
|-
| 1896 || April || Giovanni Bonelli || Settimio Lonfernini
|-
| 1896 || October   || Menetto Bonelli || Marino Babboni
|-
| 1897 || April || Luigi Tonnini || Teodoro Ceccoli
|-
| 1897 || October   || Antonio Belluzzi || Pasquale Busignani
|-
| 1898 || April || Pietro Filippi || Onofrio Fattori
|-
| 1898 || October   || Marino Borbiconi || Francesco Marcucci
|-
| 1899 || April || Gemino Gozi || Giacomo Marcucci
|-
| 1899 || October   || Federico Gozi || Silvestro Vita
|-
| 1900 || April || Domenico Fattori || Antonio Righi
|-
| 1900 || October || Giovanni Bonelli || Pietro Ugolini
|-
|}

Notes

See also
 Diarchy
 List of Captains Regent of San Marino, 1243–1500
 List of Captains Regent of San Marino, 1500–1700
 List of Captains Regent of San Marino, 1900–present
 Politics of San Marino

List 1701-1900
San Marino, Captains-Regent 1701-1900
Captains Regent